Vasu Vikram is an Indian actor and stage director who has worked on Tamil-language films and in television dramas.

Career
Vasu Vikram is the son of actor M. R. R. Vasu, and the grandson of M. R. Radha. Several other members of his family are also in films, including his uncle Radha Ravi and aunts Raadhika and Nirosha. He made his acting debut with Palaivanathil Pattampoochi (1988) and has continued to appear in supporting roles in films, appearing in villainous and comedy roles. Vasu Vikram has also appeared in Radhika's television serial, Chithi and won critical acclaim for his portrayal of a villainous character.

Filmography

Television

References

External links
 

Indian male film actors
Tamil male actors
Male actors from Chennai
Living people
Tamil comedians
Male actors in Tamil cinema
1966 births